The 1982–83 Eredivisie season was the 23rd season of the Eredivisie, the top level of ice hockey in the Netherlands. Four teams participated in the league, and the Heerenveen Flyers won the championship.

Regular season

External links
Nederlandse IJshockey Bond

Neth
Eredivisie (ice hockey) seasons
Ere